Loran de Munck (born 9 May 1999) is a Dutch artistic gymnast.

Athletic career 
De Munck had his European Championships debut in Szczecin 2019. After missing the European Championships pommel horse final with 9th place in the qualification in 2021 he qualified for the final in Munich 2022. There he became the first Dutch pommel horse medallist with a silver medal behind Harutyun Merdinyan.

In his first World Artistic Gymnastics Championships final, 2022 in Liverpool, De Munck placed 6th in the pommel horse final after a fall.

External links

References 

1999 births
Living people
Dutch male artistic gymnasts
Sportspeople from Haarlem